Youthful Cheaters is a 1923 American silent drama film directed by Frank Tuttle and starring William Calhoun, Glenn Hunter, and Martha Mansfield.

Cast
 William Calhoun as Edmund McDonald 
 Glenn Hunter as Ted MacDonald 
 Martha Mansfield as Lois Brooke 
 Marie Burke as Mrs. H. Clifton Brooke 
 Nona Marden as Marie Choisuil 
 Dwight Wiman as Dexter French

Preservation
With no prints of Youthful Cheaters located in any film archives, it is a lost film.

References

Bibliography
 Munden, Kenneth White. The American Film Institute Catalog of Motion Pictures Produced in the United States, Part 1. University of California Press, 1997.

External links

1923 films
1923 drama films
1920s English-language films
American silent feature films
Silent American drama films
Films directed by Frank Tuttle
American black-and-white films
Films distributed by W. W. Hodkinson Corporation
1920s American films